Cafe Pharoah ( foaled 3 March 2017) is an American-bred, Japanese-trained Thoroughbred racehorse. As a two-year-old in 2019, he established himself as a top-class dirt performer in the following year, winning the Hyacinth Stakes, Unicorn Stakes and Sirius Stakes. In 2021 he won the February Stakes.

Background
Cafe Pharoah is a bay colt with a small white star bred in Kentucky by Paul P Pompa. In March 2019, after failing to find a buyer at Keeneland as a yearling, he was consigned to the Ocala Breeders' Sales Company Sale of Two-Year-Olds in Training and was bought for $475,000 by the bloodstock agency Narvick International. The colt was exported to Japan and entered training with Noriyuki Hori. He carries the yellow and black racing colours of Koichi Nishikawa. As of February 2021 Cafe Pharoah has raced exclusively on dirt tracks.

He was from the first crop of foals sired by American Pharoah won the American Triple Crown and the Breeders' Cup Classic in 2015. Like his sire, his name uses an unconventional spelling of Pharaoh. Cafe Pharoah's dam Mary's Follies showed good racing form on turf in the United States, winning four races including the Grade II Mrs. Revere Stakes and the Grade III Boiling Springs Stakes. She was descended from the American broodmare Charwoman (foaled in 1926), making her a distant relative of Bounding Home and Riva Ridge.

Racing career

2019: two-year-old season
Cafe Pharoah made his first and only appearance of 2019 in a contest for previously unraced two-year-olds over 1800 metres at Nakayama Racecourse on 14 December when he was ridden by the British jockey Ryan Moore. Starting favourite against thirteen opponents he led from the start and won by ten lengths from Barnard Loop, who was in turn nine lengths clear of the rest.

2020: three-year-old season

For his first run as a three-year-old Cafe Pharoah was stepped up in class for the Listed Hyacinth Stakes over 1600 metres at Tokyo Racecourse on 23 February and started the 1.1/1 favourite ahead of Tagano Beauty, a colt who had finished fourth in the Grade 1 Asahi Hai Futurity Stakes. Ridden by Mirco Demuro he raced towards the rear and was only eighth entering the straight but then finished strongly, took the lead in the closing stages, and won by a length from Tagano Beauty. After a break of almost four months the colt was partnered by Damian Lane when he started favourite for the Grade 3 Unicorn Stakes over the same course and distance. After tracking the front-running Lecce Baroque he took the lead in the straight and drew away to win by five lengths. On 9 July at the National Association of Racing's Ohi Racecourse Cafe Pharoah started favourite for the Japan Dirt Derby but sustained his first defeat as he ran disappointingly on the sloppy track and finished seventh behind Danon Pharaoh.

Following a late summer break, Cafe Pharoah returned to the track in October at Chukyo Racecourse to contest the Sirius Stakes, a race which saw him matched against older horses for the first time. Ridden for the first time by Christophe Lemaire he started the 0.7/1 favourite with the best-fancied of his fifteen opponents in the 1900 metre contest being the five-year-old Ardore. He raced in mid-division before making progress on the outside on the final turn and produced a sustained run to overtake Sakura Allure in the final strides and win by three quarters of a length. On his final run of the year the colt started second favourite behind the 2019 JRA Award for Best Dirt Horse winner Chrysoberyl in the Grade 1 Champions Cup over 1800 metres at Chukyo on 6 December. He raced on the outside in tenth place before making steady progress in the straight but never looked like winning and came home sixth behind the five-year-old Chuwa Wizard.

In the official Japanese rankings Cafe Pharaoh was rated the best three-year-old colt of 2020 on dirt, level with half-brother Danon Pharaoh (whose dam is Crisp, finished seventh in the 2010 Kentucky Oaks).

2021: four-Year-Old Season
Cafe Pharoah began his third campaign in the Grade One February Stakes over 1600 metres at Tokyo Racecourse on February 21. In the build-up to the race, Noriyuki Hori explained that Lemaire had been unable to ride the horse in training owing to COVID-19 restrictions, and also said that the colt would be equipped with blinkers for the first time. Cafe Pharoah started the 2.3/1 favourite in a sixteen horse field which also included Inti (winner of the race in 2019), Arctos (Procyon Stakes winner), Red Le Zele (Negishi Stakes winner), Sunrise Nova (Procyon Stakes winner), Auvergne (Tokai Stakes winner), Wonder Lider (Musashino Stakes winner), Air Spinel (Daily Hai Nisai Stakes winner), Air Almas (Tokai Stakes winner), and Wide Pharaoh (New Zealand Trophy winner). After racing in third behind Wide Pharaoh and Air Almas, Cafe Pharoah went to the front in the straight and held off the late challenge of Air Spinel to win by three quarters of a length. His victory gave his sire American Pharoah his first Japan Grade 1 winner and first Grade 1 winner on dirt.  After the race Lemaire said "His condition was super, and I had confidence already at the paddock. We decided to use cheek pieces hoping for a more aggressive performance. His start was good, we were positioned well and he responded beautifully. The colt has such high potential... I'm happy that it all worked out today".

Pedigree

References

2017 racehorse births
Racehorses bred in Kentucky
Racehorses trained in Japan
Thoroughbred family 1-k